Arsenalsgatan is a street on Blasieholmen peninsula in central Stockholm. Arsenalsgatan passes through Blasieholmstorg and is a partly pedestrianised street.

References

Streets in Stockholm